

Portugal
 Angola – Paulo Caetano de Albuquerque, Governor of Angola (1726–1732)
 Macau – Antonio Moniz Barreto, Governor of Macau (1727–1732)

Colonial governors
Colonial governors
1729